Mohsin Jouhar Bilal Al-Khaldi (born 16 August 1988), commonly known as Mohsin Al-Khaldi or Mohsin Jouhar, is an Omani footballer who plays as a midfielder for Saham in the Oman Professional League.

International career
Al-Khaldi won his first cap for the Omani national team on 27 May 2014 in a friendly match against Uzbekistan. He inherited the captain's armband after Ahmed Mubarak Al-Mahaijri retired in 2019. He represented Oman at the 2015 AFC Asian Cup, the 2019 AFC Asian Cup and the 2021 FIFA Arab Cup, which he captained.

During the third round of qualification for the 2022 FIFA World Cup, he scored directly from a corner against Vietnam and almost replicated it against China PR, but the latter accidentally turned out to be an assist for Amjad Al-Harthi.

International goals
Scores and results list Oman's goal tally first.

References

External links
 
 
 
 Mohsen Johar at Goal.com
 Mohsin Al-Khaldi at ASIAN CUP Australia 2015

1988 births
Living people
Omani footballers
Oman international footballers
Association football midfielders
2015 AFC Asian Cup players
Fanja SC players
Saham SC players
Oman Professional League players
Ohod Club players
Expatriate footballers in Saudi Arabia
Omani expatriate sportspeople in Saudi Arabia
Saudi Professional League players
2019 AFC Asian Cup players